Count Pyotr Alexandrovich Rumyantsev-Zadunaisky (– ) was one of the foremost Russian generals of the 18th century. He governed Little Russia in the name of Empress Catherine the Great from the abolition of the Cossack Hetmanate in 1764 until Catherine's death 32 years later. Monuments to his victories include the Kagul Obelisk in Tsarskoye Selo (1772), the Rumyantsev Obelisk on Vasilievsky Island (1798–1801), and a galaxy of Derzhavin's odes.

Early life 
Peter was the only son of Count Alexander Rumyantsev, of Moldovan origins, by Maria, the daughter and heiress of Count Andrey Matveyev. As his mother spent much time in the company of Peter the Great, rumours suggested that the young Rumyantsev was the monarch's illegitimate son. He was named after the ruling Emperor who was his godfather. He was the brother of Praskovya Bruce, confidant of Catherine the Great.

Pyotr Alexandrovich first saw military service under his nominal father in the war with Sweden (1741–1743). He personally carried to the Empress the peace treaty of Åbo, concluded by his father in 1743. Thereupon he gained promotion to the rank of colonel.

His first military glory dates from the great battles of the Seven Years' War (1756–1763), those of Gross-Jägersdorf (1757) and Kunersdorf (1759). In 1761 he besieged and took the Pomeranian fortress of Kolberg, thus clearing for Russian armies the path to Berlin.

First Russo-Turkish War 

Throughout the reign of Catherine the Great, Rumyantsev served as supreme governor of Little Russia. In this post, which his father had held with so much honesty, Rumyantsev made it his priority to eliminate any autonomy of the hetmans and to fully incorporate the newly conquered territories into the Russian Empire. Some accuse him of having promoted serfdom in New Russia, but the choice of such a policy remained out of his control.

With the outbreak of the Russo-Turkish war in 1768, Rumyantsev took command of the army sent to capture Azov. He thoroughly defeated the Turks in the Battles of Larga and Kagula, crossed the Danube and advanced to Romania. For these dazzling victories he became Field-Marshal and gained the victory title Zadunaisky (meaning "Trans-Danubian"). When his forces approached Shumla in 1774, the new Sultan Abdul Hamid I started to panic and sued for peace, which Rumyanstev signed upon a military tambourine at the village of Küçük Kaynarca.

Second Russo-Turkish War 
By that point, Rumyantsev had undoubtedly become the most famous Russian commander. Other Catharinian generals, notably Potemkin, allegedly regarded his fame with such jealousy that they wouldn't permit him to take the command again. In times of peace, Rumyantsev expressed his innovative views on the martial art in the Instructions (1761), Customs of Military Service (1770), and the Thoughts (1777). These works provided a theoretical base for the re-organisation of the Russian army undertaken by Potemkin.

During the Second Russo-Turkish War, Rumyantsev suspected Potemkin of deliberately curtailing supplies of his army and presently resigned his command. In the Polish campaign of 1794 he once again won appointment as commander-in-chief, but his rival Suvorov actually led the armies into battle. On this occasion Rumyantsev didn't bother even to leave his Ukrainian manor at Tashan which he had rebuilt into a fortress. He died there on 19 December 1796, just over a month after Catherine's death, and was interred in the Kiev Pechersk Lavra.

As the story goes, old Rumyantsev-Zadunaisky grew enormously fat and  avaricious, so that he pretended not to recognize his own sons when they came from the capital to ask for money. Under his son Sergey's administration, Tashan fell into ruins, although he erected a mausoleum near Balashikha for his father's reburial (which never took place). Neither Sergey nor his brother Nikolay Petrovich Rumyantsev married, and the comital branch of the Rumyantsev family became extinct upon their death.

Gallery

See also 

 Operation Polkovodets Rumyantsev

References 

1725 births
1796 deaths
Military personnel from Moscow
People from Moskovsky Uyezd
Counts of the Russian Empire
Russian people of Romanian descent
Russian people of Moldovan descent
Field marshals of Russia
Little Russia Governorate
Recipients of the Order of St. George of the First Degree
18th-century military personnel from the Russian Empire
Russian military personnel of the Seven Years' War
Governors-General of Kiev
Governors-General of Little Russia
People of the Russo-Turkish War (1768–1774)
People of the Silesian Wars
Collegium of Little Russia (1722–1727)
Recipients of the Order of the White Eagle (Poland)